Johann Adam Philipp Hepp (26 October 1797, in Kaiserslautern – 5 February 1867, in Frankfurt am Main) was a German physician and lichenologist.

He studied medicine at the University of Würzburg, and from 1826 worked as a doctor in Neustadt an der Haardt. Because of his activities during the German revolutionary period of 1848–49, he was forced to move to Switzerland, where he lived in exile for the rest of his life. In Switzerland he devoted his time to lichenological research, and in 1857 published a work on European lichens titled Die Flechten Europas in getrockneten mikroskopisch untersuchten Exemplaren mit Beschreibung und Abbildung ihrer Sporen. He died on 5 February 1867 while visiting his daughter in Frankfurt.

Honours
The mycological family Heppiaceae commemorates his name, as does the lichen genus Heppia (Nägeli ex A.Massal, 1854), the botanical genus  Heppiella (Regel, 1853; family Gesneriaceae), the fungal genus Neoheppia (Zahlbr., 1909), and Heppsora is a genus of lichenized fungi, (in the family Ramalinaceae D.D. Awasthi & Kr.P. Singh, 1977).

References 

1797 births
1867 deaths
People from Kaiserslautern
University of Würzburg alumni
German lichenologists
People of the Revolutions of 1848
German revolutionaries
Members of the Bavarian Chamber of Deputies